Sergei Vladimirovich Dementyev (born 25 June 1971) is a former Russian football player.

External links
 

1971 births
Footballers from Makhachkala
Living people
Soviet footballers
FC SKA Rostov-on-Don players
Russian footballers
FC Rostov players
Russian Premier League players
FC Tyumen players
FC KAMAZ Naberezhnye Chelny players
Association football midfielders
FC Orenburg players
FC Taganrog players
FC Mashuk-KMV Pyatigorsk players
FC Dynamo Makhachkala players